The Saskatchewan Group is a stratigraphical unit of Frasnian age in the Western Canadian Sedimentary Basin.

It takes the name from the province of Saskatchewan, and was first described in the Mobil Oil Woodley Sinclair Cantuar X-2-21 well by A.D Baillie in 1953.

Lithology
The Saskatchewan Group is composed of carbonates with thin evaporites.

Distribution
It is present in the sub-surface throughout the Williston Basin.

Subdivisions
The Saskatchewan Group contains the following formations, from top to base:

Relationship to other units
The Saskatchewan Group is conformably overlain by the Three Forks Group and conformably overlays the Manitoba Group carbonates.

It is equivalent to the upper Beaverhill Lake Formation, the Woodbend Group and the lower part of the Winterburn Group in central Alberta, and with the Jefferson Group in Montana and North Dakota.

References

Stratigraphy of Alberta
Stratigraphy of Saskatchewan